Necat Aygün (born 26 February 1980) is a German former professional footballer who played as a defender.

Career
Aygün was born in Munich.

After retiring in summer 2014, Aygün was hired as a scout for TSV 1860 Munich. In summer 2015, he was promoted to sporting director of the first team. He was replaced by Oliver Kreuzer on 4 November 2015.

After that, Aygün did not work for a professional club before he took up a position as technical director for sports at the second division club Karlsruher SC on 1 February 2020.

References

External links 
 
 

1981 births
Living people
German people of Turkish descent
German footballers
Association football defenders
Stuttgarter Kickers players
MSV Duisburg players
TSV 1860 Munich players
TSV 1860 Munich II players
Beşiktaş J.K. footballers
FC Ingolstadt 04 players
SV Sandhausen players
Bundesliga players
2. Bundesliga players
3. Liga players
Footballers from Munich
German expatriate footballers
German expatriate sportspeople in Turkey
Expatriate footballers in Turkey